Sudogodsky District is an administrative and municipal district (raion), one of the sixteen in Vladimir Oblast, Russia. It is located in the center of the oblast. Its administrative center is the town of Sudogda. Population:   44,429 (2002 Census);  The population of Sudogda accounts for 29.3% of the district's total population.

References

Notes

Sources

Districts of Vladimir Oblast